Highway 694 is a highway in the Canadian province of Saskatchewan that connects Highway 3 in the Rural Municipality of Canwood No. 494 to Highway 55 at Polwarth. South of Highway 55, Highway 694 is named Hilldrop Road. The highway extends north, in the north central area of Saskatchewan, west of Prince Albert.

Communities 
Polwarth and Ahtahkakoop Cree Nation are the two communities along the course of the highway. Polwarth is too small to be enumerated on its own, and in the 2006 census it was enumerated as a part of the RM of Canwood. Ahtahkakoop Cree Nation is populated with 1,101 residents.

Travel route 
Highway 694 begins west of Shellbrook and east of Shell Lake. Highway 694 extends north  to the Highway 55 intersection. At Km 2.0 Highway 694 intersects with a range road which provides access to Ordale west of the highway. The highway turns sharply to the west at Km 13.2. Continue bearing west until Km 15.3, when the highway returns to the northerly direction. The land area reserved for Indian reserve Ahtahkakoop 104 is west of the highway. Continuing west on the range road will provide a thoroughfare into the Indian reserve. The terminus of Highway 694 is at Polwarth, at the Highway 5 intersection.

Highway 694 has no intersections with any major highway.

See also
Roads in Saskatchewan
Transportation in Saskatchewan

References 

694